Catwoman is a DC Comics character. 

Catwoman may also refer to:
Catwoman (film), a 2004 film based on the DC character
Catwoman (video game), a video game based on the 2004 film
DC Showcase: Catwoman, also titled as simply Catwoman, a 2011 short animated film
 Catwoman: Guardian of Gotham, a 1999 graphic novel by Doug Moench with art by Jim Balent published by DC Comics
 Catwoman: When in Rome, a 2004 DC Comics series
Holly Robinson (character), a DC Comics character, ally of Selina Kyle, who temporarily replaced her as Catwoman
Jocelyn Wildenstein, American socialite with extensive cosmetic surgery resulting in a cat-like appearance

Other uses
 Soo Catwoman, also known as Soo Lucas, a member of Britain's 1970s punk rock subculture
 Cat-Women of the Moon, an influential 1953 science fiction film
 Feline human–animal hybrids, fictional or mythical entities that incorporate elements from both humans and cats

See also
 Catgirl (disambiguation)
 Catman (disambiguation)
 Cat People (disambiguation)